The 1993 Texas Longhorns football team represented the University of Texas at Austin during the 1993 NCAA Division I-A football season. They were represented in the Southwest Conference. They played their home games at Texas Memorial Stadium in Austin, Texas. The team was led by head coach John Mackovic.

Schedule

Roster

References

Texas
Texas Longhorns football seasons
Texas Longhorns football